Benediktov (Russian: Бенедиктов) is a Russian-origin surname. Persons with that name include:

 Ivan Benediktov (1902–1983), Soviet politician
 Vladimir Benediktov (1807–1873), Russian writer

References

Russian-language surnames